Brachylaimidae is a family of parasitic flukes in the sub-class Digenea. Adults are usually found within the digestive tracts and other organs of mammals or birds and have a complex three-stage life cycle.

Characteristics
The adult body is elongate or occasionally oval or subglobular. sometimes with fine spines. The suckers are well-developed and usually at the anterior end. There is usually a prepharynx, the pharynx is muscular, the oesophagus, if present, is short and the caeca long, terminating near the posterior end. The gonads are posterior to the ventral sucker and the genital pore opens on the ventral surface.

Hosts
Adult flukes in this family are found in mammals, birds and occasionally amphibians. There are two intermediate hosts, both terrestrial molluscs. The cercariae leave the first intermediate host with easily  shed, rudimentary tails and the metacercariae in the second intermediate host may or may not be encysted.

References

Trematode families
Diplostomida